Abdul Khaliq known as Abdul Khaliq Hazara, (1916 — December 18, 1933) was a Hazara student who assassinated Mohammed Nadir Shah, King of Afghanistan on 8 November 1933, during an award distribution ceremony. He was quickly arrested, tortured and later executed by quartering along with most of his relatives.

The assassination of Nadir Khan may have been done in revenge for the taxes and execution of Hazaras, and for actions of Ghulam Nabi Charkhi who was a former Afghanistan ambassador to Moscow who took part in the Afghan civil war of 1928-29 as a supporter of the previous ruler of Afghanistan, the reform-minded Amanullah Khan.

Life 
Khaliq was born in 1916 in the Chindawol area of Kabul, Afghanistan. He was a student at Nejat High School.

Khaliq witnessed the rise of King Nadir Khan from 1929 and the assassinations of Afghanistan's intellectuals and politicians. Nadir, who was a general of King Amanullah Khan, was summoned by Amanullah to fight against Habibullah Kalakani and restore the monarchy, but instead Nadir proclaimed himself king. He systematically hand-picked supporters of Amanullah Khan and imprisoned them. For years he plucked any person who he would think would someday stand against his reign were eliminated.  The wrath of Nadir was over anyone not of the Mohammadzai tribe, his targets included the former king and his Pashtun clans, the Tajiks of the north and the Hazaras of central Afghanistan.
 
In 1933, Khaliq's uncle, brothers and father were arrested by Nadir Khan's regime after the execution of Ghulam Nabi Charkhi, an Amanullah supporter.

Assassination of the King 
Khaliq plotted to kill King Nadir Khan. The first attempt was at the Independence Day gathering at the Id Gah Mosque, but Khaliq did not attend. A few months later, opportunity arose when Nadir Shah invited athletes of his high school to the palace to distribute medals for their achievements. Khaliq was one of the attendees and saw no security units at the gates. Khaliq rode his bike back to the Pamir Cinema area and brought with him a gun that belonged to his friend Is'haq Sherdel.

Khaliq returned with a Nagant M1895 loaded with 6 bullets of 7.62×38mmR wrapped in a handkerchief hidden in his pocket. He stood behind Is'haq Sherdel and Mahmood. The national flag was lowered and Nadir Shah entered the rose garden. He examined the medals table and walked over towards the students. Khaliq reached into his pocket and pulled out the gun, aimed at Nadir Shah and pulled the trigger. The first bullet hit Nadir in his mouth, the second shot pierced Nadir's heart, and the third shot cut through Nadir's lung. The guards rushed towards Khaliq and a fourth bullet hit a guard. Khaliq then threw the gun as the guards chased him.
 
Shah Mahmood ordered the arrest of over 400 "Nejat High school" students and by executive decree ordered all students to be put to death. A soldier in the national guard convinced Mahmood that the students were innocent, and they were then released.

Execution 

Khaliq was imprisoned and under torture gave up the names of his accomplices. Khaliq was given a trial in which he named all his friends and family members as accomplices. This strength of these claims has since been questioned by the lone surviving member of Khaliq's family. He was eventually sentenced to death along with 16 others. The majority of Khaliq's family were taken to the Deh Mazang prison.

Sixteen nooses were prepared at the execution site. Khaliq was brought over and was asked with which one of his fingers he squeezed the trigger. He lifted his index finger, and immediately that finger was cut off. He was then questioned which eye he used to aim, upon which they immediately gouged out that eye with a dagger. The authorities eventually tortured Khaliq to death instead of hanging him. "Security officers tortured Khaliq by cutting his tongue and gouging his eyes and soldiers killed him with bayonets while his family and friends were forced to watch.

Khaliq is considered to be a martyr by Hazaras and the Solidarity Party of Afghanistan.

See also 
 Hazara Genocide
 Assassination
 List of Hazara people

References 

1933 deaths
Hazara people
People from Kabul
Assassins of heads of state
Regicides
20th-century executions by Afghanistan
Executed assassins
1916 births
People executed by dismemberment